Rockefeller Philanthropy Advisors (RPA) is a 501(c)(3) nonprofit organization that currently advises on and manages more than $200 million in annual charitable giving. Its headquarters are in New York City, with offices in Chicago, Los Angeles and San Francisco.

It traces its antecedents to John D. Rockefeller, Sr., who in 1891 began to professionally manage his philanthropy "as if it were a business." With thoughtful and effective philanthropy as its one and only mission, Rockefeller Philanthropy Advisors has grown into one of the world's largest philanthropic service organizations, having overseen more than $3 billion to date in grantmaking across the globe.

Rockefeller Philanthropy Advisors provides research and counsel on charitable giving, develops philanthropic programs and offers complete program, administrative and management services for foundations and trusts. RPA also operates a Charitable Giving Fund, through which clients can make gifts outside the United States, participate in funding consortia and operate nonprofit initiatives.

Rockefeller Philanthropy Advisors currently advises on and manages more than $200 million in annual giving in more than 60 countries.

References

External links
Rockefeller Philanthropy Advisors official web site

Charities based in New York City